Mirificarma cabezella is a moth of the family Gelechiidae. It is found in Portugal, Spain and Morocco.

The wingspan is 6.5-7.5 mm for males and 6.5–7 mm for females. The head is mid-brown, occasionally ochreous brown. The forewings are mottled brown, but darker in the apical half. Adults are on wing from August to October.

The larvae feed on Adenocarpus hispanicus. They feed from within the shoots. Larvae can be found in June.

References

Moths described in 1925
Mirificarma
Moths of Europe
Moths of Africa